Houlton may refer to:

Houlton, Maine, American town
Houlton (CDP), Maine, census-designated place within the Town of Houlton
Houlton, Wisconsin, American unincorporated community
Houlton, Warwickshire, housing development near Rugby, England

People with the surname
D. J. Houlton, Major League Baseball pitcher
Gerard Houlton (born 1939), English cricketer
John Houlton (1922–1996), New Zealand flying ace of the Second World War

See also
Holton (disambiguation)